Lake Loriscota or Lake Lorisccota (possibly from Aymara lurisa inflorescence of the totora, name of a river (Loriza) connected with the lake and of a village (Loriza) northeast of the lake, quta lake,) is a lake in Peru. It is situated in the Puno Region, El Collao Province, Santa Rosa District.

See also
List of lakes in Peru

Sources

References
INEI, Compendio Estadistica 2007, page 26

Lakes of Peru
Lakes of Puno Region